Na Le is a district (muang) of Luang Namtha province in northwestern Laos.

References

Districts of Luang Namtha province